The Battle of Wittstock took place during the Thirty Years' War (1618-1648).  It was fought on 24 September (Julian calendar) or 4 October (Gregorian calendar) 1636.  A Swedish-allied army commanded jointly by Johan Banér and Alexander Leslie decisively defeated a combined Imperial-Saxon army, led by Count Melchior von Hatzfeld and the Saxon Elector John George I.

Leslie and Banér commanded two distinct armies: Banér commanded the Swedish main army (huvudarmén), and Leslie commanded the Army of the Weser. Their subordinate officers included the Swedish Count and Major General Lennart Torstenson, Lieutenant General James King (later first Lord Eythin), and Major General John Ruthven who is usually erroneously conflated with his uncle Patrick Ruthven who was also a Lieutenant General in the Swedish army, but not present at Wittstock.

Context
The Holy Roman Emperor, with his Saxon and Roman Catholic allies, was fighting for the control of northern Germany against the Swedes and an alliance of Protestant princes opposed to Habsburg hegemony. The Swedes were also allied to the French, but the latter played no part in the battle. The Imperial main army was screening the Swedish army behind the Elbe while a smaller army under General Klitzing was overrunning Brandenburg. Field Marshal Johan Banér commanding the main Swedish army was joined by Field Marshal Alexander Leslie commanding the Army of the Weser which comprised German, Scottish and (at least one) English regiments. Together they crossed the Elbe with a surprise march and met their opponents in the forested hilly landscape slightly south of Wittstock.

The Imperial army was larger in strength than the Swedish army, but at least one-third of it was composed of Saxon units of questionable quality. The Swedish artillery was considerably stronger, leading the Imperial commanders to maintain a largely defensive position on the hill tops.

The battle
The Imperial forces decided to wait for the Swedes on a range of sandy hills, the Scharfenberg. A part of the Imperial front was further defended with six ditches and a wall of linked wagons. Their commanders waited for some time for the Swedish troops to appear on the open fields to their front. Instead, the Swedish army was turning the Imperial left flank, moving behind the cover of a series of linked hills. The Imperial troops were forced to redeploy their lines to set up a new front.

The battle was begun by small forces detached in detail to secure the hills. The Swedes, under Banér had problems moving up reinforcements through marshy ground, but battle was eventually joined along a wide front.

Banér and Leslie had detached one-fourth of the army under Lieutenant-General James King and Major-General Torsten Stålhandske to take a long detour around the Imperial right flank. They found the traverse difficult and slow, leading Banér's troops to take heavy casualties and begin to retreat. Alexander Leslie moved five of his regiments to his relief taking heavy casualties in the process with the Scottish and English regiments being particularly badly mauled. Nonetheless they were able to relieve Banér in time for King's cavalry to finally outflank the Imperial troops causing a rout. With Major General Vitzthum in the reserve refusing to engage the Imperials, his role was taken by Major-General John Ruthven (Leslie's son-in-law) who had been so deployed for just such an emergency. Now attacked on two fronts and with the reserve brigades engaged, the Imperial forces, having lost all their artillery, retreated under the cover of dusk in full rout.

Conclusion
In the accounts of the battle preserved in National Archives of Sweden, Johan Banér accredits the victory to Field Marshal Leslie. Leslie, in his personal correspondence to the Swedish Chancellor, Axel Oxenstierna, was clearly horrified at the losses sustained by his army and implies that there had been disagreement about the wisdom of Banér's tactics before the battle. A third report, by James King conforms with Leslie's, but also contains additional information. All three have been transcribed, translated and published in English. Nevertheless, Wittstock was a resounding victory for the Swedish forces and corrected any delusions harboured by the Imperials that they were a spent force after the earlier battle of Nördlingen.

Maps

References

Sources

. —  originally published in the Independent under the byline of "Allen Hall in Berlin" on Page 29.

Wittstock
1636 in Europe
Wittstock 1637
Wittstock 1636
Wittstock 1636
Wittstock 1636
Wittstock
Wittstock